Gregory Stewart Ion (born March 12, 1963 in Vancouver) is a Canadian retired soccer midfielder.

Professional
The son of Gordie Ion, Ion graduated from Burnaby North Secondary School.  In 1981, the Portland Timbers selected him in the first round of the North American Soccer League draft.  However, he lost the entire 1981 season with a knee injury.  He came back in 1982 and played nine games, but the team folded at the end of the season.  He then signed with the Montreal Manic, but that team collapsed at the end of the 1983 season.  On November 10, 1983, the Fort Lauderdale Strikers purchased his contract from the Manic.  The Strikers sent Ion to the Tulsa Roughnecks during the 1984 pre-season.  When the NASL collapsed at the end of the season, Ion moved to the Los Angeles Lazers of the Major Indoor Soccer League.  He remained with the Lazers until March 26, 1987 when the team traded him to the Minnesota Strikers in exchange for Thompson Usiyan.  He finished the season with the Strikers.  On October 2, 1987, the Strikers traded him to the San Diego Sockers in exchange for draft picks and cash.  On November 6, 1987, the Sockers waived Ion during the pre-season as part of a salary reduction move.  The Chicago Sting quickly signed him and he spent the 1987–1988 season in Chicago.  The Sting, facing financial collapse, released Ion and ten other players on June 2, 1988.  Ion then moved to the Kansas City Comets for two seasons.  In 1990, he moved to the Tacoma Stars for two seasons.

During the 1986 and 1989, Ion played for the Vancouver 86ers of the Canadian Soccer League. He is inducted into the BC Sports Hall of Fame as member of the record setting 1989 team.

National team
Ion was part of the Canadian team that participated in their only FIFA World Cup to date in 1986.

Post-playing career
Ion was soccer marketer for Adidas and is Program Director of their ESP youth program.  He currently runs his own marketing company.  He has also been Administrative Director of Club Development with youth soccer club Washington Premier Football Club, in Tacoma, Washington.  He is a USSF A licensed coach.

Greg has three daughters Kelsey, Claire and Katelynn.

References

External links
 

1963 births
Living people
1986 FIFA World Cup players
American soccer coaches
Canadian expatriate sportspeople in the United States
Canadian expatriate soccer players
Canada men's international soccer players
Canadian soccer coaches
Canadian Soccer League (1987–1992) players
Canadian soccer players
Canadian people of Scottish descent
Chicago Sting (MISL) players
Expatriate soccer players in the United States
Association football midfielders
Kansas City Comets (original MISL) players
Los Angeles Lazers players
Major Indoor Soccer League (1978–1992) players
Montreal Manic players
North American Soccer League (1968–1984) players
Soccer players from Tacoma, Washington
Soccer players from Vancouver
Portland Timbers (1975–1982) players
Tacoma Stars players
Tulsa Roughnecks (1978–1984) players
Vancouver Whitecaps (1986–2010) players